KRZR (1400 AM) is an American radio station broadcasting a talk radio format, simulcasting KALZ 96.7 FM Fowler, California. Licensed to Visalia, California, United States.  The station is currently owned by iHeartMedia, Inc.  Its studios are located on Shaw Avenue in North Fresno, and the transmitter tower is in Visalia.

External links
FCC History Cards for KRZR 

RZR
Radio stations established in 1948
1948 establishments in California
Talk radio stations in the United States
IHeartMedia radio stations